Altendorf may refer to:
Altendorf, Schwyz, a municipality in Switzerland
Altendorf, Upper Franconia, a town in the district of Bamberg, Bavaria, Germany
Altendorf, Upper Palatinate, a town in the district of Schwandorf, Bavaria, Germany
Altendorf (Sebnitz), a village in Sebnitz municipality, Saxony, Germany
Altendorf, Austria, a town in the district of Neunkirchen in Lower Austria
Altendorf GmbH, a woodworking machinery manufacturer from Minden, North Rhine-Westphalia, Germany
Altendorf (megalithic tomb), an archaeological site near Naumburg, Hesse, Germany
Altendorf, a village in the municipality of Brome, Germany
Altendorf, Essen, a borough of the city of Essen, North Rhine-Westphalia, Germany

See also
 Altdorf (disambiguation)